WERS (88.9 FM) is one of Emerson College's two radio stations (the other being campus station WECB), located in Boston, Massachusetts, United States. Programming features over 20 different styles of music and news, including live performances and interviews.  WERS stands as the oldest non-commercial radio station in New England, and has been in operation since November 1949.  Among the founders of the station was WEEI program director Arthur F. Edes, who first taught broadcasting courses at Emerson in 1932 and helped to plan a campus radio station.  The chief architect of WERS in its early years was Professor Charles William Dudley.

Translators

In June 2007, WERS inaugurated a translator station on 96.5 MHz in New Bedford, Massachusetts, relaying WERS's programming to New Bedford and nearby communities.  Another translator, on 101.5 MHz in Gloucester, Massachusetts, on Cape Ann, went on the air in July 2008.

Critical acclaim
According to The Princeton Review, WERS is the #1 college radio station in America, an award the station has won or come close to winning almost every year since The Princeton Review started ranking colleges.

WERS is the most highly rated student-run college radio station in the US. In the Boston market (10th largest in the nation), WERS's daytime programming usually ranks at 20th to 25th.

Sports
In the late 1990s and mid-2000s, WERS featured a successful sports-themed program, Sports Sunday, which aired Sundays from noon to 2 pm. The program won three consecutive Associated Press annual awards for student sports programming (2002, 2003, and 2004).  Guests of the show included former basketball great Bill Walton, Boston Globe columnist Kevin Paul DuPont, Hockey East commissioner Joe Bertagna, former Northeastern University men’s hockey head coach Bruce Crowder, InsideHockey.com columnist James Murphy, and NHL.com columnist Bob Snow.

Former show hosts include Lon Nichols (current anchor for KLKN in Lincoln, Nebraska), Lowell Galindo (current ESPNU anchor), Tom Gauthier (current radio broadcaster and director of media relations for the Bowling Green Hot Rods), Justin Termine (current anchor and producer for NBA Radio on Sirius), Mike Gastonguay (interned as an associate producer for KXTA’s Loose Cannons), Matt Porter (Palm Beach Post Miami Hurricanes beat reporter), Steve Crowe (Boston Globe part-timer) and Ryan Heisler (noted triathlete).

References

External links
 Official Website
 WERS Broadcast Stream
 WECB - Emerson's On-Campus Radio Station

Emerson College
ERS
Radio stations established in 1949
ERS
1949 establishments in Massachusetts